The 2011 CERH Women's European League was the 5th season of Europe's premier female club roller hockey competition organized by CERH.

Voltregà achieved its second title, finishing its second treble in the club's history.

Results
The Final Four was played in Weil am Rhein, Germany

References

External links
 

CERH
Rink Hockey European Female League